Édgar Alberto García (born September 20, 1987) is a Dominican professional baseball pitcher who is currently a free agent.

Career

Philadelphia Phillies
He began his career in 2005 at 17 years old in the Philadelphia Phillies system, remaining there until 2010, reaching as high as the Double-A Reading Phillies in 2008. He played 2010 with the Clearwater Threshers and became a free agent after the season.

Kansas City Royals
On June 14, 2011, García signed a minor league contract with the Kansas City Royals organization. He split the season between the advanced Single-A Wilmington Blue Rocks and the Double-A Northwest Arkansas Naturals. He was assigned to the Idaho Falls Chukars for the 2012 season.

El Paso Diablos
García signed with the El Paso Diablos of the American Association of Independent Professional Baseball partway through the 2012 season, appearing in 4 games for the club, allowing 21 runs in 20.2 innings.

Philadelphia Phillies (second stint)
On December 19, 2012, García signed a minor league contract with the Philadelphia Phillies, the team who originally signed him. García was assigned to Reading to begin the season but was released on April 27, 2013.

Arizona Diamondbacks
On December 16, 2014, García signed a minor league contract with the Arizona Diamondbacks organization. He split the 2015 season with the Double-A Mobile BayBears and the Triple-A Reno Aces. He elected free agency on November 6, 2015 and re-signed with the Diamondbacks on a minor league contract on November 19. On May 14, 2016, García pitched a complete game shutout for the Mobile BayBears. García split 2016 with Mobile and Reno and elected free agency after the season.

Sultanes de Monterrey
On March 30, 2017, García signed with the Sultanes de Monterrey of the Mexican League. On April 13, 2017, he was released.

Piratas de Campeche
On June 19, 2017, García signed with the Piratas de Campeche of the Mexican League. On January 4, 2018, he was released by the team.

International career
He represented the Dominican in the 2017 World Baseball Classic. In the 2017 regular season, he pitched in the Mexican League.

References

External links

1987 births
Living people
Baseball players at the 2019 Pan American Games
Batavia Muckdogs players
Clearwater Threshers players
Dominican Republic expatriate baseball players in Mexico
El Paso Diablos players
Estrellas Orientales players
Florida Complex League Phillies players
Lakewood BlueClaws players
Mexican League baseball pitchers
Mobile BayBears players
Northwest Arkansas Naturals players
Piratas de Campeche players
Reading Phillies players
Reno Aces players
Scottsdale Scorpions players
Sultanes de Monterrey players
Tigres del Licey players
Williamsport Crosscutters players
Wilmington Blue Rocks players
Pan American Games competitors for the Dominican Republic
People from San Juan Province (Dominican Republic)